Independent set  may refer to:

 Linearly independent, of a set of vectors in a vector space.
 Independent set of elements of a matroid. See Matroid#Independent sets.
 Independent set (graph theory), a set of vertices that share no edges.